Split This Rock is a national nonprofit organization of poets, artists, and activists based in Washington, D.C.

The organization's stated goals are: To celebrate the poetry of provocation and witness being written, published, and performed in the United States today; and to call poets to a greater role in public life and to equip them with the tools they need to be effective advocates in their communities and in the nation.

In pursuit of these goals, the organization held its first poetry festival in March 2008 in Washington, D.C., which featured four days of poetry readings, workshops, walking tours, and a march to The White House. More than 300 people participated in the full festival, with some 2,000 people visiting one or more of the festival readings or other events.

Featured poets included: Chris August, Jimmy Santiago Baca, Coleman Barks, Dennis Brutus, Kenneth Carroll, Grace Cavalieri, Mark Doty, Martín Espada, Brian Gilmore, Carolyn Forché, Galway Kinnell, Stephen Kuusisto, Semezdin Mehmedinović, E. Ethelbert Miller, Naomi Shihab Nye, Alix Olson, Alicia Ostriker, Ishle Yi Park, Joel Dias Porter, Patricia Smith, Susan Tichy, Pamela Uschuk, and Belle Waring. Lucille Clifton and Sharon Olds were on the original list of featured poets but could not attend.

Split This Rock's second poetry festival was March 10–13, 2010, in Washington, DC's U Street neighborhood. Featured poets for the 2010 festival were: Chris Abani, Lillian Allen, Sinan Antoon, Francisco Aragón, Jan Beatty, Martha Collins, Cornelius Eady, Martín Espada, Andrea Gibson, Allison Hedge Coke, Natalie Illum, Fady Joudah, Toni Asante Lightfoot, Richard McCann, Jeffrey McDaniel, Lenelle Moïse, Nancy Morejón, Mark Nowak, Wang Ping, Patricia Smith, Arthur Sze, and Quincy Troupe. Bruce Weigl was on the list of featured poets but was unable to attend.

The third festival was held in March 2012.

References 
 Chapbook 24: Split This Rock Chapbook, Beloit Poetry Journal, Volume 58, Number 3, Spring 2008
 Beltway Poetry Quarterly Volume 9, Number 1, SPLIT THIS ROCK: Poems of Provocation & Witness, Winter 2008.
 Montgomery, David, "Averse to War," The Washington Post, March 22, 2008.
 Tuckey, Melissa, "Interview with Naomi Shihab Nye," Fiesta, Foreign Policy in Focus September 16, 2008.
 Wolfe, Kathi, "Provocative festival comes to town," Washington Blade, March 14, 2008.

External links
 Split This Rock
 DC Poets Against the War
 The Institute for Policy Studies
 Busboys and Poets
 SOL y SOUL

American writers' organizations
Poetry organizations
Literary festivals in the United States
Culture of Washington, D.C.
Arts organizations based in Washington, D.C.